Fuglebakken KFUM Århus (commonly known as Fuglebakken), is an association football club based in Aarhus V, Denmark, that competes in the Jutland Series, the sixth tier of the Danish football league system and the highest tier of the regional football association. Founded in 2008 as the superstructure of KFUMs Boldklub Århus and Idrætsforeningen Hasle Fuglebakken (IFH), the club play at their home ground Højlyngen. Their colours are red and navy. Fuglebakken KFUM is affiliated to the local football association, DBU Jutland.

References

External links
 Official site

 
Association football clubs established in 2008
Football clubs in Denmark
2008 establishments in Denmark
Sport in Aarhus